Grandhi Srinivas is an Indian politician. He belongs to the YSR Congress Party. Srinivas was a Member of the Andhra Pradesh Legislative Assembly and represented the Bhimavaram constituency from 2004 to 2009. In 2009, he joined Praja Rajyam Party as Indian National Congress gave an MLA ticket to Ramanjaneyulu Pulaparthi (Anjibabu). However, Praja Rajyam Party announced Vegesna Suryanarayana Raju as MLA candidate. In 2014, he joined YSR Congress Party and contested in Legislative Assembly elections but lost to Ramanjaneyulu Pulaparthi (Anjibabu) from the Telugu Desam Party.

References

Indian National Congress politicians from Andhra Pradesh
Andhra Pradesh MLAs 2004–2009
Living people
People from West Godavari district
Year of birth missing (living people)
Praja Rajyam Party politicians
YSR Congress Party politicians
Andhra Pradesh MLAs 2019–2024